St. John's Episcopal Church, also known as Old St. John's, is a historic Episcopal church building located near Eolia, Pike County, Missouri. It was built about 1856, and is a one-story, rectangular, brick church in a transitional Greek Revival / Gothic Revival style. It rests on a limestone block foundation and simple ridge roof.

It was listed on the National Register of Historic Places in 1970.

References

External links
 

Episcopal church buildings in Missouri
Greek Revival church buildings in Missouri
Gothic Revival church buildings in Missouri
Churches completed in 1856
Churches on the National Register of Historic Places in Missouri
Buildings and structures in Pike County, Missouri
19th-century Episcopal church buildings
National Register of Historic Places in Pike County, Missouri